The Hyundai Staria is a 5-door van and minivan manufactured by Hyundai since 2021. It was introduced as the successor to the Starex, ditching the rear-wheel-drive layout from the Starex to a front-wheel-drive-based platform shared with other large Hyundai and Kia vehicles. The name "Staria" was coined by combining the word "star" with "ria". It is currently marketed in South Korea, South Africa, Southeast Asia, Australasia, Middle East, and several European countries.

Overview 
Interior and exterior images of the Staria were released on 18 March 2021. Following the automaker's new design theme "Inside Out," the vehicle is said to feature the look of a spaceship and a wide-open cabin.

Hyundai designers also introduced a low beltline to create larger side windows, which is called "wide panoramic windows". Top Gear magazine noted that the Staria was very spacious but that this came at the expense of it "scraping the roof in car parks because it's so bleeding tall". The Drive noted that its increased size relative to its predecessor made it harder to park in tight spaces, such as those found in multi-storey car parks, even with the assistance of cameras.

The Staria comes in two versions, a standard model and a high-end variant which is known as the Staria Lounge or Staria Premium in several markets. A cargo version is also offered in several regions.

Staria 
The standard model offers various trim levels including Tourer and Cargo. The front features a horizontal daytime running lights and headlamps and a radiator grille that has the same color with the car body. The vehicle has a large panoramic window and low beltline for a higher visibility. Inside, a 10.25-inch front display screen and the HVAC system controller are housed while a color LCD cluster is positioned at the top of the dashboard.

The Staria was launched in Thailand on 9 July 2021. It comes in 11-seater variant and imported from South Korea.

The Staria for Australian market was launched on 5 August 2021, replacing the iMax. It is available in three grades: Standard, Elite, and the top-range Highlander. Available in both petrol V6 and diesel engines, the petrol variants are available with front-wheel drive, while diesel variants comes with all-wheel drive. The blind van version called the Staria Load was launched in Australia on 20 September 2021, replacing the iLoad.

In Malaysia, the Staria Premium was launched on 27 October 2021 in 7-seater guise. The standard Staria was launched on 5 October 2022 in three grades: the entry-level Lite, the mid-grade Plus and the top-spec Max. Unlike other international markets, the Malaysian market Staria only comes with 10-seater as opposed to the 11-seater offered in International markets.

The Staria was also launched in the Philippines in July 2022. It is offered in Cargo, Commuter, GLS+ and Premium grades, all offered with the 2.2-litre diesel engine.

Staria Lounge/Premium 
The Staria Lounge or Staria Premium is an upscale version of the Staria, which is available in 7-seater and 9-seater models. The front end feature a redesigned mesh-patterned radiator grille, full LED headlamps and turn signals. Other design features include 18-inch alloy wheels, front and rear bumper garnishes and side mirrors. The rear part is equipped with an LED rear combination lamp. The interior features a 64-color ambient mood light. The 7-seater has "premium relaxation seats" while the 9-seater has "swiveling seats". It was released on 9 August 2021. It is the sole version of the Staria in some markets, including Indonesia, Malaysia, and several European markets.

The model was released in Indonesia on 20 August 2021 with in 7-seater and 9-seater Signature variants. The Staria Lounge was released in Malaysia on 27 October 2021 as the Staria Premium to replace the Grand Starex. It is powered by the 2.2-litre turbo-diesel engine. It was also released in Thailand on 22 March 2022. The Staria Premium was introduced in the Philippines on 20 June 2022 and it became available on dealerships on 17 August 2022. Unlike other Southeast Asian countries, the Philippine market Staria Premium is offered with HTRAC all-wheel drive System with 8-speed automatic transmission.

Staria Lounge Limousine 
It was released on 19 April 2022. The Staria Lounge Limousine is the top trim of the Staria Lounge. The second-row passenger seat electric side step is automatically deployed according to the sliding door opening and closing. It is located on the underside of the vehicle when driving. The indoor electric height has been extended by 205mm from the basic trim. A movable console that can move from row 1 to row 2 has been applied. In addition, a 25-inch rear seat display, built-in air purifier, and starry sky mood lighting were added. And electric steering devices and limousine specialized suspension were applied.

Staria Lounge Camper 
It was released on 19 April 2022. The Staria Lounge Camper is a camping car model with specifications for camping in the Staria Lounge Prestige trim. It consists of two models: 11-seater semi-type Camper 11 and 4-seater deluxe type Camper 4. It can be used as a sleeping space by adjusting the angle of the second row full flat sheet or lifting the loop upward. Camper 4 has been applied with an integrated 12.1-inch foldable controller and monitor, a third-row reclining bench, and a 36-liter built-in refrigerator and sink.

Specifications

References

External links 

 Official website
 Official website (Van)

Staria
Cars introduced in 2021
Minibuses
Vans
Front-wheel-drive vehicles
All-wheel-drive vehicles